Piman (also Romanized as Pīmān) is a village in Aq Kahriz Rural District, Nowbaran District, Saveh County, Markazi Province, Iran. At the 2006 census, its population was 130, in 46 families.

References 

Populated places in Saveh County